The Regional Museum of Natural History, Bhopal is a branch of the National Museum of Natural History, New Delhi, located in the Environment Complex on Shahpura Lake in Bhopal. The museum was inaugurated on 29 September 1997, by the then Minister of Environment and Forests of India, Saifuddin Soz. The program was chaired by the then Chief Minister of Madhya Pradesh, Digvijaya Singh.  

The museum's collection tells the story of the interactions between humans and the natural world, specifically in Central India, and its galleries are accompanied by transcripts, translations and audio tours and include a replica of a Rajasaurus skull.

See also
 National Museum of Natural History, New Delhi
 List of destroyed heritage
 Rajiv Gandhi Regional Museum of Natural History, Sawai Madhopur
 Regional Museum of Natural History, Bhubaneswar
 Regional Museum of Natural History, Mysore

References

External links 
 http://nmnh.nic.in/bhopal.htm

Museums in Bhopal
Natural history museums in India